Komala Dewi (born 1 September 1989) is an Indonesian badminton player, specializing in doubles play. Dewi joined PB Djarum badminton club in 2007, then in the same year she won the Jakarta Open.

Achievements

BWF Grand Prix 
The BWF Grand Prix had two levels, the Grand Prix and Grand Prix Gold. It was a series of badminton tournaments sanctioned by the Badminton World Federation (BWF) and played between 2007 and 2017.

Women's doubles

  BWF Grand Prix Gold tournament
  BWF Grand Prix tournament

BWF International Challenge/Series 
Women's doubles

Mixed doubles

  BWF International Challenge tournament
  BWF International Series tournament
  BWF Future Series tournament

References

External links 
 

1989 births
Living people
People from Sumedang
Sportspeople from West Java
Indonesian female badminton players
Universiade gold medalists for Indonesia
Universiade medalists in badminton
Medalists at the 2011 Summer Universiade